Vato Gonzalez (born 6 June 1983 as Björn Franken) is a Dutch record producer, songwriter, artist, DJ, who is signed to Spinnin' Records and DOORN Records. Best known for his single Badman Riddim (Jump) (featuring Foreign Beggars), which reached No. 7 on the UK Singles Chart after a release on 19 June 2011.

Biography

Early life
Franken was born in Spijkenisse, Netherlands. As a teenager he developed an interest in graphic design before he started to focus on making music.

2007–2009: Dirty House
Between 2007 and 2009 Franken released 5 mixtapes in the 'Dirty House' series, It was around the time of this release he and this song started to gain mainstream attention.

2010–present: Badman Riddim
Badman Riddim, in addition to a vocal version which featured UK hip-hop/grime/dubstep group Foreign Beggars and was given the new title Badman Riddim, began to start gaining airplay from some BBC Radio 1 DJs in the UK in late 2010. As attention for the single started to grow Franken was signed to Ministry of Sound and a music video was made for the song. The single was released in the UK on 19 June 2011 and entered the UK Singles Chart at No. 7, the first hit in the country for both acts involved.

On 7 January 2013, Not a Saint was released. It features Lethal Bizzle and Donae'o. It is a remix of the same song by Bizzle and Donae'o. The remix featured positive feedback and was released as a collaborative single. It peaked at number 20 in the UK Singles Chart.

Since late 2013, Franken signed to DOORN Records. He released his first song under the label, "Triplets Riddim" on 30 December 2013. There is a scheduled upcoming single "Bio Riddim" of which the release date will soon be announced.

Discography

Singles

Remixes

Remix EPs

References

External links
  Official Website
 Profile at Spinnin Records

1983 births
Living people
Club DJs
Dutch dance musicians
Dutch electronic musicians
Remixers
Robbins Entertainment artists
People from Spijkenisse